The 4th West India Regiment was one of the West India Regiments (WIRs) in the British Army. It was originally formed in 1795 under the command of Colonel Oliver Nicolls. Nearly all of the rank and file soldiers were born in Africa. Before 1807 they had generally been purchased from slave ships by the army. But after the parliamentary abolition of the British transatlantic slave trade in 1807, the British Navy intercepted ships of other nations carrying slaves, and often these slaves were recruited to the West India Regiments.

Gibraltar
The 4th WIR was stationed in Gibraltar from 14 March 1817 to 9 March 1819. At the end of this assignment they were dispatched to Sierra Leone where the regiment was disbanded.

Colonels
The following officers served as colonels of the regiment:
General Oliver Nicolls 20 May 1795
Lieutenant-General Sir Thomas Maitland 19 July 1807
Lieutenant-General Sir James Leith 19 July 1811
Field-Marshal Lord Strafford 12 December 1816
Disbanded 24 April 1819, reconstituted February 1862
Lieutenant-General Sir Robert Garrett 1 April 1862
Lieutenant-General John Angerstein 14 January 1866
General George Thomas Colomb 24 April 1866
Disbanded 1 April 1869

References

Military of Sierra Leone
History of the Caribbean
Regiments of Caribbean nations
Military in the Caribbean
British West Indies
Infantry regiments of the British Army
Military units and formations established in 1795
British military units and formations of the War of 1812
British colonial regiments